In North America, an out-of-market sports package is a form of subscription television that broadcasts sporting events to areas where the events were unable to be seen by viewers on other broadcast and cable television networks due to the games not being broadcast in their local market.

Many leagues with major television contracts establish elaborate rules regarding which games are broadcast in different regions (with local teams usually getting preference). For viewers who prefer to see a game other than the one being locally broadcast in their designated market area, the out-of-market package provides additional options.

Rationales

While such a thing was not necessary to the average sports fan who lives in the market of their team, many circumstances may be in place that generate the desire to view teams out of the market. Some include:
 Fans moving from the market of their favorite team – while that team could be viewed nationally on broadcast or cable television, or when the team plays the local sports franchise, those opportunities are few and far between;
 Simply being a fan of an out of market team;
 Better competition – such as in the case of college football and basketball. For example, the option to watch a few of the most competitive or most interesting national games each week, in addition to one's home team's games. Except for the Southeastern Conference, for example, no conference is assured of a national game of the week at the same time slot every week;
 Additional opportunities to watch one sport – such as when a home team may not have a game to play, or creating one's own doubleheader; watching an early game, then a late-game;
 Rivalries – having the desire to watch a rival team's games, or games of teams in the same athletic conference or division as one's favorite teams, which may not be regularly available in one's market;
 Living in an area without an in-market team at the highest level in a sport – this usually means availability only of nationally televised games. Though these will often show a regional game, it may be the "most interesting" regional game, resulting in many missed games even when following the geographically closest team.  Leagues will often designate "secondary markets" to prevent this from happening;
 Involvement in a fantasy sports league – a sports fan who is "managing" a fantasy team may have the desire to watch the performance of players in several games that are being played simultaneously and thus has the ability to switch back and forth between games.
 Sports betting – a fan who wishes to watch events affecting wagers as they occur, as with a fantasy sports fan.
 Blackouts – most major sports leagues had a blackout policy that prevents viewers of a particular television channel (usually a regional sports network) from seeing games on that channel outside of a certain geographic area (specifically to direct out of town viewers to the package).

Packages

Cable and satellite
 MLB Extra Innings - Available to DirecTV and most digital cable providers. Provides full access to MLB.tv
 MLS Direct Kick - Available to DirecTV, Dish Network and most digital cable providers.
 NBA League Pass - Available to DirecTV, Dish Network and most digital cable providers.
 NFL Sunday Ticket - Exclusive to DirecTV*
 NHL Center Ice - Available to DirecTV, Dish Network and most digital cable providers
 ESPN College Extra - Available to DirecTV and most digital cable providers.

* NFL Sunday Ticket is exclusive to DirecTV in the United States, but in other countries (most notably Canada) it is available more broadly, on several cable providers.

Internet
Internet sports packages are primarily marketed directly to consumers and not through cable or satellite providers. Current Internet television and radio subscription or pay-per-view services include:
 ESPN+
 MLB.tv
 MLB.com Gameday Audio
 MiLB.tv
 NFL Audio Pass (NFL, radio)
 NHL Live (Canada, marketed and distributed by Rogers Communications through the 2025-26 NHL season); NHL package in the United States is part of ESPN+
 NBA League Pass Broadband
 Peacock, for NBC Sports events, including the Premier League, the Olympic Games and some MLB games
 UFC Fight Pass
 WNBA League Pass
 WWE Network; in the United States, is part of Peacock

Major League Baseball and the National Football League are the only professional sports leagues to black out local affiliates' internet radio feeds. Ironically, while the NFL charges money for radio feeds, it sells the Internet television rights to other networks that make those games available online for free, the opposite model of the other U.S cities major sports leagues.

See also
Regional sports network

References

Cable television in the United States
Sports television in the United States
Cable television in Canada
Sports television in Canada
 
Bundled products or services